Music Force Europe is a music channel based in Greece.

History
Music Force Europe is a reincarnation of TVC, Greece's first 24-hour music channel. TVC (TV Chidira) began operating out in Lesbos back in 1993. In opposition to TMF and MTV Dance, it is not country-localized and depicts all the subgenres of electronic and dance music: trance, house, Italo disco, disco, eurohouse, progressive, dance, electro, breakbeat, chill out, drum and bass, eurodance, garage, eurobeat, uplifting, italo, lounge, techno, or old skool.

External links
Official website

 Dance music television channels
 Television channels in Greece
 Television channels and stations established in 1993